Pretty Please may refer to:

 Pretty Please (album), album by Hector on Stilts 2000
 "Pretty Please" (song), song by Dua Lipa from Future Nostalgia, 2020
 "Pretty Please", also "Pretty Please (Love Me)", song by Estelle   2008
 "Pretty Please", song and video by Jackson Wang & Galantis
 "Pretty Please", song by Melissa Reese